The Dhaka Tribune is a major Bangladeshi English-language daily newspaper based in Dhaka, the country's capital and largest city. It also operates an online Bengali version known as the Bangla Tribune. The newspaper has a strong readership in Bangladeshi cities, particularly among the young generation, the diplomatic community and expatriates; as well as a wider readership in South Asia and internationally. The newspaper is notable for its highly diverse op-ed content, with contributions from leading Bangladeshi, South Asian and international columnists. It also organizes the Dhaka Literary Festival.

The newspaper is notable for being the fastest-growing English-language news media in Bangladesh's history, catering to the country's business community, middle class, public and private universities, and English medium schools. Several award-winning journalists have worked with the newspaper.

History
The newspaper began publication on 19 April 2013. The newspaper started as a broadsheet before going compact on 1 March 2015. Since 1 May 2019, it has reverted to broadsheet editions. Since 2015, it has been the media partner of the Dhaka Literary Festival. Dhaka Tribune won the Most Innovative Special Supplement award at the Bangladesh Media Innovation Awards 2022 held in September 2022.

Owners and staff
Gemcon Group is the largest shareholder in the Dhaka Tribune. Gemcon is run by the family of Kazi Nabil Ahmed, a member of Bangladesh's parliament from the ruling Awami League. Gemcon is also the owner of the University of Liberal Arts Bangladesh (ULAB). The newspaper's founding and chief editor is Zafar Sobhan, a 2005 Young Global Leader and 2008 Yale World Fellow. Sobhan previously worked at The Daily Star for seven years and was the editor of Forum magazine for four years; he formerly worked at The Independent, Dhaka Courier and Shokaler Khobor. Sobhan became Bangladesh's first internationally syndicated columnist with articles published in many newspapers and magazines, including The Guardian, The Sunday Guardian, Time and Outlook among others. The business editor at Dhaka Tribune is Esha Aurora, who also writes about feminism and discrimination. The publisher of the newspaper is Kazi Anis Ahmed, an author of Bangladeshi writing in English and a well known commentator on Bangladesh in international media. Ahmed's articles have been published in The New York Times, Time, The Guardian, Daily Beast, Wall Street Journal, Nikkei Asian Review, and Politico. Abu Sayeed Asiful Islam serves as associate editor. Its bureau chief in London is solicitor Niaz Alam.

Columnists
Some of the paper's columnists include American economist Forrest Cookson, British economist Tim Worstall, Bangladeshi writer Syed Badrul Ahsan, Jordan's Prince Hassan bin Talal, and Bangladeshi climate scientist Saleemul Huq.

Editorial content
The Dhaka Tribune is known for a relatively liberal editorial policy which allows a wide range of views and promotes coverage of Bangladesh-India relations, Bangladesh-United States relations, Bangladesh-China relations, women's rights and LGBTQ rights. It is one of the few publications in Bangladesh to allow articles calling for the decriminalization of LGBTQ rights. During the 2022 Russian invasion of Ukraine, the newspaper interviewed Ukrainian foreign policy adviser Svitlana Zalishchuk; and the Russian ambassador in Dhaka later accused the Bangladeshi media of being biased.

Syndicate
The newspaper has content sharing agreements with Project Syndicate, The Conversation and Scroll.in.

Rohingya refugees
In 2014, Myanmar summoned Bangladesh's ambassador over an article in the Dhaka Tribune calling for a referendum in Rakhine State. The article also sparked protests by Buddhist nationalists  in Yangon. During the 2017 military crackdown in Myanmar against the Rohingya, the newspaper was one of the few English-language media reporting directly from the Bangladesh-Myanmar border to a global audience. The newspaper is a leading provider of news and commentary concerning Rohingya refugees in Bangladesh, publishing articles by diplomats, NGO leaders, lawyers and activists.

Human rights
The newspaper regularly publishes articles on human rights issues in Bangladesh, including repealing Section 377, inheritance under Hindu law, and press freedom. On women's issues, the newspaper has reported that 97% of sex offences in Bangladesh go unreported.

Censorship and defamation
In 2019, a Dhaka Tribune journalist was arrested and sued under the Digital Security Act for reporting voting irregularities in a by-election. The paper has cited Bangladesh's defamation laws as an obstacle to reporting about corruption in the country's security forces. Its editorial in response to a documentary about corruption in the country's army was cited by journalist Tim Sebastian during an interview with Bangladesh government advisor Gowher Rizvi on DW.

See also
 List of newspapers in Bangladesh

References 

Daily newspapers published in Bangladesh
English-language newspapers published in Bangladesh
Newspapers published in Dhaka